Kinetochore protein Spc24 is a protein that in humans is encoded by the SPC24 gene.

References

Further reading